Turbinicarpus swobodae is a species of plant in the family Cactaceae. It is endemic to Mexico.  Its natural habitat is hot deserts.

References

External links
 
 
 

swobodae
Cacti of Mexico
Endemic flora of Mexico
Critically endangered plants
Endangered biota of Mexico
Taxonomy articles created by Polbot